The Cause of It All is a play in two parts by Leo Tolstoy published in 1910, and later translated by Aylmer and Louise Maude.  It heavily features anti-alcohol and teetotaling themes.

It is recommended reading according to the 1925 publication, "A Study of the Modern Drama," according to Barrett Harper Clark.  It is quoted in a 2013 text about Tolstoy's work called "the Best Stories Don't Come from Good Vs. Bad But Good Vs. Good".

Links

 Source of text.
 The Cause of It All, at RevoltLib.com
 The Cause of It All, at Marxists.org
 The Cause of It All, at TheAnarchistLibrary
 The Cause of It All, at Google Books
 The Cause of It All, at Gutenberg.org

References

Books by Leo Tolstoy
1910 fiction books